The 2021 Asian Archery Championships were the 22nd edition of the event, and was held at the Bangladesh Army Stadium in Dhaka, Bangladesh from 14 to 19 November 2021.

Medal summary

Recurve

Compound

Medal table

References

External links
 Results

Asian
Asian Archery Championships
Asian Archery Championships
Archery
Asian Archery Championships
International sports competitions hosted by Bangladesh
Archery